E. Marinella is an Italian necktie company founded by Eugenio Marinella in 1914 in Naples and is famous of having one of the best ties in the world. It's a small shop of just 20 square metres, a charming lounge offering real treasures of refinement and taste, opened in Naples in 1914 on one of the most beautiful seafronts in Italy, a promenade for Neapolitan high society.

It has standalone stores in Naples, Milan, Rome and Tokyo. The brand is also sold In New York at Bergdorf Goodman department store.

Each tie is handmade and unique.

History
In 1914 Eugenio Marinella decided to open a shop in Piazza Vittoria on Riviera di Chiaia, in Naples. Gradually, the boutique becomes a point of reference for elegance. In the 1980s the name Marinella began to land outside the Italian borders thanks to the President of the Republic Francesco Cossiga who took the habit of bringing a box containing five Marinella ties as a gift to the heads of state on his official visits.
Eugenio and then Luigi Marinella personally went to England to choose the fabrics for their ties and shirts. The whole boutique in Naples was made by Eugenio Marinella with English materials, including the door jambs.

Today, the company is run by Eugenio's grandson, Maurizio Marinella, and his son, Alessandro Marinella.

Clients
Politicians such as Barack Obama, John F. Kennedy , Bill Clinton, Nicolas Sarkozy , Boris Yeltsin, Silvio Berlusconi, Jacques Chirac and Hosni Mubarak have worn Marinella ties, as have King Juan Carlos, Prince Charles, Gianni Agnelli, Prince Albert of Monaco, Aristotle Onassis. Over time, important personalities on a global level,  Ambassadors and Foreign Ministers have chosen E.Marinella ties.

E. Marinella Became the Tailor of U.S. Presidents.

MoMA of New York. 
“ITEMS: Is Fashion Modern?” was the title of the exhibition dedicated to fashion, held at the MoMA in New York, where 111 iconic clothing items from the 20th and 21st centuries were exhibited. Among these, as the pride of Made in Italy, were E. Marinella ties.

Products
In addition to ties, E. Marinella also sells bags, watches, cologne, accessories and cufflinks for men. Their line of women's products include bags, scarves, perfumes and accessories.

See also 

Made in Italy

References

External links

Companies based in Naples
Clothing brands of Italy
Clothing companies established in 1914
Italian companies established in 1914
High fashion brands
Fashion accessory brands
Luxury brands